The uninhabited Barry Islands are members of the Canadian Arctic Archipelago in the Kitikmeot Region, Nunavut. They are located in Bathurst Inlet, southeast of Wollaston Point.

Its two major islands are Algak Island and Kanuyak Island.

References 

Islands of Bathurst Inlet
Uninhabited islands of Kitikmeot Region